The 1981 Sicilian regional election took place on 21 June 1981.

Christian Democracy was by far the largest party, largely ahead of the Italian Communist Party. During the legislature the Christian Democrats governed the Region in coalition with the Italian Socialist Party, the Italian Republican Party, the Italian Democratic Socialist Party and the Italian Liberal Party (Pentapartito).

Results

Sources: Istituto Cattaneo and Sicilian Regional Assembly

References

Elections in Sicily
1981 elections in Italy
June 1981 events in Europe